Saira Elizabeth Luiza Shah (née Elizabeth Louise MacKenzie; 1900 – 15 August 1960) was a Scottish writer who wrote under the pen name Morag Murray Abdullah. She met the Pashtun author, poet, diplomat, scholar, and savant Sirdar Ikbal Ali Shah and wrote about her marriage to this chieftain's son and her travels in the North-West Frontier Province of British India and the mountains of Afghanistan.

Life and work
Elizabeth Louise Mackenzie – later Saira Elizabeth Luiza Shah – came from a middle-class Scottish family. Her future husband, Sirdar Ikbal Ali Shah, who was descended from the Sadaat of Paghman, had settled in England before the first world war and she met him in Edinburgh during that war, where he was studying medicine at Edinburgh Medical School. Overcoming the resistance of both their families, they married, eventually settling in the prince's Khyber homeland. They had three children, the Sufi writers and translators Amina Shah (b. 1918), Omar Ali-Shah (b. 1922) and Idries Shah (b. 1924).

Writing under the pseudonym of "Morag Murray Abdullah", her first book, entitled My Khyber Marriage: Experiences of a Scotswoman as the Wife of a Pathan Chieftain's Son was an autobiography of meeting her husband, falling in love and leaving behind her family and her safe middle-class Scottish family life, to travel to the war-torn North-West Frontier Province of British India and her chieftain husband's ancestral homeland in the high mountains of the Hindu Kush in Afghanistan. It told of her, a Protestant, learning and adapting to their Muslim culture, laws and rigid codes of honour. For her, it was a journey from the predictable into the unknown.

Her second book, Valley of the Giant Buddhas, was a study of the people and customs of the Afghan people whom she encountered in her travels, accompanying her husband on diplomatic missions and journeys into the valleys and into the remote mountain regions. The statues referred to in the book are the Buddhas of Bamyan which were blown up by the Taliban. The Weekend Telegraph described the work as "a book for connoisseurs of the unexpected."

She also wrote a paper, The Kaif System, in New Research on Current Philosophical Systems, London: Octagon Press, (1968).

Saira Elizabeth Luiza Shah died on 15 August 1960, according to her tombstone in the Muslim section of the cemetery at Brookwood, Woking, Surrey, England where she, Ikbal Ali-Shah and other members of the Shah family are buried. Her husband died on 4 November 1969 in Tangier, Morocco, as the result of a motor accident.

References

External links
 Octagon Press
 

1900 births
1960 deaths
20th-century Scottish writers
British expatriates in Afghanistan
Indologists
Saira Elizabeth Luiza Shah
Writers from Edinburgh
Burials at Brookwood Cemetery